is Maaya Sakamoto's eighteenth single. The title track was used as the opening theme for the anime Kobato. The live version of Kazamidori and Pocket wo Kara ni Shite are from her concert at Tokyo International Forum Hall A on January 24, 2009 with live arrangement by Shin Kōno.

Track listing

Charts

References

2009 singles
2009 songs
Maaya Sakamoto songs
Songs written by Maaya Sakamoto
Victor Entertainment singles
Anime songs